"Far Longer than Forever" is the theme song from the animated movie The Swan Princess, written by Lex de Azevedo, David Zippel and composed by Lex de Azevedo. The song is performed by Regina Belle and Jeffrey Osborne.

It was nominated for a Golden Globe in 1995 for Best Original Song, but lost to "Can You Feel The Love Tonight" by Elton John and Tim Rice from The Lion King.

Production

The Dreams Come True song "Eternity" was used as the B-side for this song.

Personnel
Regina Belle - vocals
Jeffrey Osborne - vocals
Robbie Buchanan - producer, arranger, keyboards, synth, bass, drum programming
Michael Thompson - guitar

Critical reception
A writer for The New York Times noted, "The melody of 'Far Longer Than Forever'...echoes the first five notes of Beauty and the Beast. 
 The Animated Movie Guide said the song had a theme of faith. This commercial single was jointly released by Sony Wonder and Sony 550 Music. MusicHound Soundtracks: The Essential Album Guide to Film, Television and Stage Music called the "seemingly mandatory big ballad" as "extremely annoying" due to "strik[ing] a totally different artistic note" in the contect of the film's musical landscape. The Motion Picture Guide 1995 Annual: The Films of 1994 said the song was deserving of the Golden Globe. Star-News deemed the song "insistent" noting that audiences may "quickly get [their] fill" of the tune

Context
It is sung within the context of the film as a love song, and again performed over the credits as an RnB ballad by Regina Belle and Jeffrey Osborne. In the 1994 animated film, the song was performed by vocalists, Liz Callaway, as the singing voice of Princess Odette, and Howard McGillin, as the speaking and singing voice of Prince Derek. In the closing credits, a popular rendition of the song was performed by renowned R&B recording artists, Regina Belle and Jeffrey Osborne. Michelle Nicastro and Kenneth Cope sing a reprise of the song in the 1997 sequel The Swan Princess: Escape from Castle Mountain.

The lyrics of the song revolve around the bond between two lovers who, although they are far apart, have faith that their love would eventually draw them together once again. In the film version, Princess Odette and Prince Derek are pledging their love for each other, despite the fact that distance and circumstances separate them.  However, they truly believe that their love shared could overcome any barrier.

References

1994 singles
1994 songs
1990s ballads
American pop songs
Contemporary R&B ballads
Song recordings produced by Robbie Buchanan
Songs based on fairy tales
Songs written for animated films
The Swan Princess
Songs with music by Lex de Azevedo
Songs with lyrics by David Zippel
Regina Belle songs
Jeffrey Osborne songs
Liz Callaway songs
Love themes
Pop ballads
Soul ballads
Male–female vocal duets